The Poland men's national tennis team represents Poland in Davis Cup tennis competition and are governed by the Polski Związek Tenisowy.

Poland currently compete in World Group I Play-offs.

Current team (2022)

 Kamil Majchrzak
 Kacper Zuk 
 Olaf Pieczkowski
 Jan Zielinski
 Łukasz Kubot (Doubles player)

History
Poland first played Davis Cup in 1925 (match with Great Britain loss 0–5) and contested in the World Group for the first time in 2016. Its best performance has been reaching the Europe/Africa Zone Group I second round.

2020-2022

2010–2019

2000–2009

1990–1999

1980–1989

1970–1979

1960–1969

1950–1959

1940–1949

1930–1939

1925–1929

Head-to-head record

(+)
  3–0
  2–1
  1–0
  3–0
  1–0
  2–1
  6–0
  1–0
  4–2
  1-0
  1–0
  2–0
  3–0
  2–0
  4–0
  1–0
  2–0
  1–0
  3–1
  2–1
  2–1
  5–1
  3–2
  1–0
  2–1
  1-0
  2–1
  1–0

(-)
  0–1
  0–1
  1–4
  0–4
  0–1
  0–2
  2–4
  0–3
  0–1
  1–2
  1–7
  2–3
  0–9
  1–3
  0–1
  0–1
  1–2
  0–1
  1–4
  1–2

(=)
  1–1
  1–1
  2–2
  2–2
  1-1
  1–1

See also
Davis Cup
Poland Fed Cup team
Poland Hopman Cup team

References

External links

Davis Cup teams
Davis Cup
Davis Cup